Telephone numbers in Canada follow the fixed-length Bell System format, consisting of the country code 1, followed by a three-digit area code, a three-digit central office code (or exchange code) and a four-digit station code. This is represented as 1 NPA NXX XXXX, in which the country code is "1".

Local calls from Canadian landlines must be dialled without the leading 1, which is used as the trunk prefix for domestic long-distance calls. Toll calls from Canada to other North American Numbering Plan countries are dialled in the same format (eleven digits) as domestic calls. Overseas calls to locations outside country code 1 are dialled with the 011 international prefix, followed by the country code and the national significant number.

Mobile phones 
As the recipient of a mobile call pays airtime, standard mobile phone numbers are not uniquely different from land-line numbers and thus follow the same format and area codes as for land-lines. Numbers may be ported between landline and mobile. The rarely used non-geographic area code 600 is one exception to this pattern (non-portable, and allows caller-pays-airtime satellite telephony); some independent landline exchanges are also non-portable.

Mobile phone providers support either CDMA or GSM; both are being supplanted by UMTS. Telus shut down its CDMA in mid-2015; Bell Mobility's CDMA network, the country's last major provider of that type, went dark on January 1, 2017.

Toll-free and premium numbers 
Non-geographic toll-free telephone numbers (+1 800, 833, 844, 855, 866, 877, 888) and premium-rate telephone numbers (+1-900) are allocated from the same blocks as the corresponding US numbers. Numbers with exchange code 976 are also expensive premium calls.

Formatting 

Canadian (and other North American Numbering Plan) telephone numbers are usually written as NPA-NXX-XXXX. For example, 250 555 0199, a fictional number, could be written as (250) 555-0199, 250-555-0199, 250-5550199, or 250/555-0199. The Government of Canada's Translation Bureau recommends using hyphens between groups; e.g. 250-555-0199. Using the modern global format for telephone numbers, a Canadian number would be written as +1NPANXXXXXX, with no spaces, hyphens, or other characters; e.g. +12505550199.

See also 

Telephone numbers in the Americas

References

External links 
 Canadian Number Administrator website

 
Telecommunications in Canada
Canada
Canada communications-related lists